The 2001 Standard Bank Triangular Tournament was a One Day International (ODI) cricket tournament held in South Africa in October 2001. It was a tri-nation series between the national representative cricket teams of the South Africa, India and Kenya. The hosts South Africa won the tournament by defeating the India by 6 wickets in the final.

Squads

Matches

1st ODI

2nd ODI

3rd ODI

4th ODI

5th ODI

6th ODI

7th ODI

8th ODI

9th ODI

Final

References

External links
 Series home at ESPN Cricinfo

Standard Bank Triangular Tournament
Standard Bank Triangular Tournament
Standard Bank Triangular Tournament
International cricket competitions in 2001–02